Tony Thorne (born 1950 in Cairo, Egypt) is a British author, linguist and lexicographer specialising in slang, jargon and cultural history. He is a leading authority on language change and language usage in the UK and across the English-speaking world.

Career 
Thorne attended Hampton School and the University of Kent at Canterbury.

Thorne's Dictionary of Contemporary Slang, published by Bloomsbury in February 2014, remains one of the only treatments of the subject to be based on examples of authentic speech rather than purely upon written or broadcast sources, while Shoot the Puppy, a survey of the latest buzzwords and jargon, drew upon his inside experience of corporate life while working as a communications consultant for multinationals, NGOs and business schools. His 100 Words That Make the English, published by Abacus in April 2011, consists of essays on one hundred key words that are most emblematic of English identity in the 20th and 21st centuries.

After explorations in Central and Eastern Europe following the fall of communism and the opening of lost archives, Tony Thorne published the definitive English-language biography of the 16th century Hungarian Countess Erzsebet Bathory, reputed to be a mass murderer who bathed in the blood of her victims. His Children of the Night is a comprehensive account of the historical origins of the vampire myth as well as its subsequent representations in literature and popular culture. The book additionally examines contemporary vampire culture through interviews with self-styled ‘living vampires'.

Thorne has also written a life of the 18th century French waxworker, Madame Tussaud, for children, and writes on outsider and visionary art.

From 1991 to 2007 he was Director of the Language Centre at King's College London where he is now Visiting Consultant. He founded and oversees the Slang and New Language Archive at King's, a library and database resource recording language change and tracking linguistic controversies.

He has written and presented programmes on language and popular culture for BBC Radio 4 and the BBC World Service, and is a regular contributor to media discussions of language controversies, communication technologies and lifestyle innovations. He contributed the ‘Yoofspeak' column to the Times Educational Supplement and wrote the 'Bizword' column in British Airway's Business Life magazine. Thorne also acts as independent consultant and expert witness in legal proceedings involving copyright and branding disputes, and criminal proceedings involving the interpretation of slang and criminal language. Most recently he has compiled lexicons of language relating to Brexit and populism  and records and comments on new language associated with the Coronavirus pandemic.

Works 

Dictionary of Contemporary Slang, Bloomsbury, first published 1990; latest (4th) edition published 2014 
Jolly Wicked, Actually: The 100 Words That Make Us English, Little, Brown Book Group, 2009 , published in a revised paperback edition entitled The 100 Words That Make the English, Abacus, 2011 
Shoot the Puppy, Penguin, London 2007 
Madame Tussaud, Short Books, London, 2004 
Children of the Night, Victor Gollancz, London, 1999 
Countess Dracula, Bloomsbury, London, 1997 
Fads, Fashions & Cults, Bloomsbury, London 1993

Contributor 

Ed J Coleman, Global English Slang, Routledge, London, 2014 
Ed M Jazbec, European Perspectives Volume 3, Number 1, 2011 
The Extraordinary Art of Laurie Lipton, beinArt Publishing, Brunswick, Victoria, 2010 
Ed K Malmkjaer, Routledge Linguistics Encyclopedia, Routledge, London, 2009 
(with Neil Murray) (eds) Multicultural Perspectives on English Language and Literature, Tallinn Pedagogical University/King's College London, Tallinn, London, 2004 
Malcolm McKesson, Matriarchy: Freedom in Bondage, Heck Editions, New York, 1996

References

External links 
 https://www.kcl.ac.uk/research/slang-and-new-language
 https://language-and-innovation.com/
 http://www.lawagency.co.uk/writer/tony-thorne
 http://issuu.com/shepherdneame/docs/spitfire_dictionary_203x127_hi?e=3265750/8488148

1950 births
Living people
Linguists from the United Kingdom
British lexicographers
British biographers
Egyptian emigrants to the United Kingdom
Academics of King's College London